The Moth is an international arts and literature magazine, based in Milltown, County Cavan, Ireland. It features poetry, short fiction, art and interviews.
 
The magazine was established in 2010 by Rebecca O'Connor and Will Govan and is produced four times a year. Former contributors include Max Porter, Claire-Louise Bennett, Mike McCormack, Joshua Cohen, Suzanne Joinson, Rob Doyle, Thomas Morris, Sara Baume, Lee Rourke, Thomas Maloney, June Caldwell, Owen Booth, Robert McLiam Wilson, Nicholas Hogg, John Boyne, Nuala Ni Conchúir, Hilary Fannin and Stephen May. 

A junior version is also published, called The Caterpillar, aimed at 7-11 year olds.

Prizes run by The Moth include The Moth International Poetry Prize, The Moth Short Story Prize, The Caterpillar Poetry Prize, The Caterpillar Short Story Prize and The Moth Art Prize.

The Moth International Poetry Prize (formerly the Ballymaloe International Poetry Prize) was established in 2011. €10,000 is awarded for a single unpublished poem, with three runner-up prizes of €1,000. The contest is open to anyone (over 16), as long as the poem is previously unpublished, and each year it attracts thousands of entries from new and established poets from over 50 countries.  The prize is judged anonymously by a single poet. Previous judges include Nick Laird, Claudia Rankine, Jacob Polley, Matthew Sweeney, Leontia Flynn, Marie Howe, Michael Symmons Roberts, Billy Collins, Deborah Landau and Daljit Nagra.

The Moth Short Story Prize is an international prize, open to anyone from anywhere in the world, as long as their story is original and previously unpublished. The winners are chosen by a single judge each year, who reads the stories anonymously.

Previous judges include Mike McCormack, Belinda McKeon, Donal Ryan, Kit de Waal, Kevin Barry and Mark Haddon. The judge for 2021 is Ali Smith.

The Moth Nature Writing Prize was established in 2020, and the inaugural prize was judged by Richard Mabey. The judge for 2021 is Helen Macdonald.

References

External links
 Official website
Twitter
The Caterpillar website

Literary magazines published in Ireland
Poetry literary magazines
Quarterly magazines
Magazines established in 2010